Women’s Institute for Freedom of the Press (WIFP) is an American nonprofit publishing organization that was founded in Washington, D.C. in 1972. The organization works to increase media democracy and strengthen independent media. Mo

Basic information
WIFP was founded in 1972 by Dr Donna Allen in Washington, DC. She was an economist, historian, and civil rights activist. The organization conducted seven conferences at the National Press Club in the 1970s and 1980s on "Planning a National and International Communications System for Women". WIFP held two international satellite teleconferences from the 1975 UN World Conference of Women, in Copenhagen in 1980 ("Dateline Copenhagen: A Woman's View") and Nairobi in 1985 ("Dateline Nairobi - Woman's View"). These were each four hours if international interactions between women. During the 1980 conference, women gathered in six US cities and several female delegates from other countries called in from the Second U.N. World Conference in Copenhagen. Five years later in Nairobi, groups of women came together similarly to in Copenhagen but with the addition of more countries and their delegates. As of 2017, WIFP became a member of Corporate Reform Coalition, which is a group of organizations and individuals who join together to address the influence of corporate America on the country's elections through shareholder protection.

Publications
When the Institute was founded, it immediately launched the periodical Media Report to Women with the subhead "What Women Are Doing and Thinking About the Communications Media." It was edited the first fifteen years by Dr Donna Allen. Media Report to Women was transferred in mid-1987 to Communication Research Association Inc., where it is still published. WIFP currently publishes two annual print periodicals: Voices for Media Democracy and the Directory of Women’s Media. The first version of the Directory was published in 1975, and had 154 women's periodicals. Out of these 154, there were 24 periodicals that were published outside of the United States. Fourteen years later, the Directory contained 702 publications with 300 published outside of the United States.

Issued awards

Women and Media Award 
WIFP began an annual award entitled "Women and Media Award" in 2013. It which is given to women who have made exceptional contributions toward expanding female voices in the media. The recipients of this award are:

 2012 – Maurine Beasley
 2014 – Tobe Levin
 2015 – Roxanne Dunbar
 2016 – Soraya Chemaly
 2017 – Vinie Burrows
 2018 – Angela Peabody
 2019 - Luci Murphy
 2020 - Esther Iverem, Eleanor Goldfield, Medea Benjamin, Margaret Flowers, Alina Duarte, and Anya Parampil
 2021 - Margaret Kimberley, Laura Flanders, Jennifer Pozner, Barbara Ransby, Nayoung Kim Park, and Carolyn LaDelle Bennett

Staff and Associates

Staff

President
Dana Densmore first became a board member and officer of WIFP when the organization was founded in 1972. During her time at the organization, she served as senior editor and research director. In 1968 when the women's liberation bloomed, Densmore had been a systems programmer at the Massachusetts Institute of Technology. As an outcome, she worked with Roxanne Dunbar to found the feminist organization Cell 16. The two women went on to found the journal No More Fun and Games as the organization's periodical in the same year. She is also the founder, co-director, and editor for Green Lion Press. She received her B.A. in 1965 from St. John's College in Annapolis and her M.A. in 1993 from St. John's College in Santa Fe.

Director
Martha Leslie Allen has been the Institute's Director since 1985. She is an activist for media democracy and the promotion of women's involvement in the media. 1973-1975 she founded and chaired Women's Media Project in Memphis, TN. Additionally, she was an organizer of the 1973 Women's Leadership Conference in Memphis. From 1978 to 1985, she served as the associate director of WIFP before taking the director position.  Martha earned her Ph.D. in 1988 from Howard University in Washington, DC with a dissertation on the history of women's media. She is Donna Allen's youngest daughter.

Associate Director
Elana Anderson, with a Ph.D. from Howard University, is on the board of directors of WIFP as well as serving as the Associate Director since 2011. Dr. Anderson is a native Washingtonian, instructor, lecturer, parent, and performance and fiber artist. She is a member of the American Guild for Musical Artists (AGMA) and the National Council for Negro Women. Dr. Anderson serves as an Associate Artistic Team Member of Chicago-based Deeply Rooted Productions.

Associates
In 1977, WIFP formed the Associate Network composed of "women who worked for media or were interested in how the media covered women and their concerns." This network grew to over 800 members; some of the notable associates are listed below.
 Jennifer Abod
 Caroline Ackerman
 Margie Adam
 Gifty Afenyi-Dadzie
 Dorothy Allison
 Bettina Aptheker
 Alice Backes
 Sandra Bartky
 Jessie Bernard
 Caroline Bird
 Joan Biren
 Anne Braden
 Susan Braudy
 Susan Brownmiller
 Charlotte Bunch
 Martha Burk
 Vinie Burrows
 Urvashi Butalia
 Toni Carabillo
 Jacqueline Ceballos
 Peggy Charren
 Maralyn Chase
 Phyllis Chesler
 Judy Chicago
 Michelle Cliff
 Marjory Collins
 Blanche Wiesen Cook
 Flora Crater
 Mary Daly
Thelma Dailey-Stout
 Karen DeCrow
 Barbara Deming
 Alix Dobkin
 Ariel Maria Dougherty
 Claudia Dreifus
 Andrea Dworkin
 Mary Eastwood
 Martha Edelheit
 Riane Eisler
 Jo Freeman
 Margaret Gallagher
 Georgie Anne Geyer
 Marcia Ann Gillespie
 Barbara Grier
 Susan Griffin
 Grace Halsell
 Wilma Scott Heide
 Carolyn Heilbrun
 Keiko Higuchi
 Shere Hite
 Victoria Hochberg
 Patricia Hogan
 Michael Honey
 Fran Hosken
 Florence Howe
 Donna Huata
 Perdita Huston
 Mildred Jeffrey
 Mal Johnson
 Sonia Johnson
 Jill Johnston
 Paula Kassell
 Flo Kennedy
 Jean Kilbourne
 Anne Koedt
 Lucy Komisar
 Cheris Kramarae
 Suzanne Lacy
 Louise Lamphere
 Betty Lane
 Laura Lederer
 Rochelle Lefkowtiz
 Dorchen Leidholdt
 Tobe Levin
 Audre Lorde
 Patricia Mainardi
 Tatiana Mamonova
 Del Martin
 Jewell Jackson McCabe
 Sarah McClendon
 Judith Meuli
 Casey Miller
 Susan Miller
 Kate Millett
 Virginia Ramey Mollenkott
 Robin Morgan
 Cindy Nemser
 Ethel Payne
 Ellen Peck
 Eleanor Perry
 Marge Piercy
 Letty Cottin Pogrebin
 Anne Pride
 Lana Rakow
 Frances Reid
 Malvina Reynolds
 Adrienne Rich
 Barbara Rosenthal
 Rosemary Ruether
 Florence Rush
 Diana Russell
 Bernice Sandler
 Doris Evans Saunders
 Ann Scott
 Ntozake Shange
 Gail Sheehy
 Alix Kates Shulman
 Joy Simonson
 Gloria Steinem
 Dorothy Sucher
 Kate Swift
 Irene Tinker
 Emily Toth
 Margaret Traxler
 Carmen Delgado Votaw
 Ellen Wartella
 Naomi Weisstein
 Frieda Werden
 Barbara Wertheimer
 Celeste West
 Mary Williamson
 Betsey Wright
 Laura X
 Judith Zaffirini

References

External links
 Official website

Publishing organizations
Women's organizations based in the United States
Feminist organizations in the United States